Daniel Wade Sepulveda (born January 12, 1984) is a former American football punter who played five seasons in the National Football League (NFL), all with the Pittsburgh Steelers.  He played college football for Baylor University, earned All-American honors twice, and was twice recognized as the best college punter.  The Steelers selected Sepulveda in the fourth round of the 2007 NFL Draft. He was a member of the Steelers team which won Super Bowl XLIII against the Arizona Cardinals.

Early life
Sepulveda who is of Mexican–American descent, was born in Austin, Texas.  He attended Highland Park High School in metropolitan Dallas, Texas.  Sepulveda was a fourth-string punter at Highland Park behind Ryan Wolcott (the kicker), Jason Wood (the backup), and Trey Warren (the starter).  He never made it into a game as a punter.

College career
Sepulveda attended Baylor University, where he played for the Baylor Bears football team from 2002 to 2006.  He was a walk-on to the football team as a linebacker, and after a redshirt freshman season (despite not having punted since junior high) became the Bears' starting punter, earning a scholarship after the 2003 season.  He won the Ray Guy Award tapping him as the best college punter in 2004 and 2006, and was recognized as a consensus first-team All-American in 2004 and a unanimous first-team All-American in 2006.  He, Ryan Allen and Tom Hackett are the only players to win the Ray Guy Award twice.

As of the end of the 2017 season, Sepulveda holds the NCAA FBS record for career punting average and career punts of 50+ yards.

Professional career
Sepulveda was drafted in the fourth round (112th pick) by the Pittsburgh Steelers in the 2007 NFL Draft.  After the release of former starter Chris Gardocki, Sepulveda successfully bested Mike Barr for the starting job.  Sepulveda signed a three-year contract for $1.46 million with the Steelers on May 31, 2007.

In the first quarter of a December 20 game against the St. Louis Rams, in his rookie season, Sepulveda completed a 32-yard pass to running back Najeh Davenport on a fake punt play.

On July 29, 2008, Sepulveda tore the ACL in his right leg for the second time. He had surgery to repair a torn anterior cruciate ligament on August 6. He was placed on injured reserve by the Steelers after the surgery, officially ending his season.

On December 5, 2010, he again injured his right knee in a game against the Baltimore Ravens. Jeremy Kapinos was signed to replace Sepulveda.  On July 31, 2011, the Steelers re-signed Sepulveda to a 1-year deal.

In the second quarter of an October 9, 2011 game against the Tennessee Titans Sepulveda completed his second career pass for a first down, a 33-yard pass to Ryan Mundy on a fake punt play.

It was announced on April 4, 2012 that Sepulveda would not return to the Steelers for the 2012 season.

Post-football career
Sepulveda enrolled at the SMU Dedman School of Law as part of its 2019 graduating class.

References

External links
 Baylor Bears bio 
 Pittsburgh Steelers bio

\

1984 births
Living people
All-American college football players
American football punters
Baylor Bears football players
Pittsburgh Steelers players
Players of American football from Austin, Texas
American sportspeople of Mexican descent